Calixto Martínez Quesada (born 14 October 1952) is a Cuban footballer. He competed in the men's tournament at the 1980 Summer Olympics.

References

External links
 
 

1952 births
Living people
Cuban footballers
Cuba international footballers
Association football goalkeepers
FC Pinar del Río players
Olympic footballers of Cuba
Footballers at the 1980 Summer Olympics
Pan American Games medalists in football
Pan American Games silver medalists for Cuba
Footballers at the 1979 Pan American Games
People from San Cristóbal, Cuba
Medalists at the 1979 Pan American Games